Rojales is a village in the province of Alicante and autonomous community of Valencia, Spain.

References

Populated places in the Province of Alicante